Milon's Secret Castle, known in Japan as , is a 1986 action-adventure game released by Hudson Soft for the NES. A Game Boy version was released in 1993. A sequel, DoReMi Fantasy, was released in 1996 for the Super Famicom.

Plot

The protagonist, Milon, lives in the land of Hudson where people use music to communicate with each other, but he does not have the ability to communicate. He always asked himself why he is the only one who lacks the ability to understand people and music. One day he decides to travel throughout the land of Hudson to search for other people like himself. Before leaving for his trip, Milon decides to visit Queen Eliza who lives in Castle Garland (known as "Hudson's Secret Castle" in the manual). When Milon arrives at Castle Garland, the people were being attacked by the Evil Warlord from the north region. The Warlord robs the innocent people, by stealing all their musical instruments and occupies the Castle Garland. Queen Eliza is held captive deep inside Castle Garland by the Warlord and his demon-monsters. Milon volunteers to fight the Warlord and his demons and to rescue Queen Eliza and the musical instruments for the people of Hudson. This will not be an easy task. Castle Garland has many different rooms and each room is a maze filled with demons, secret passages and doors. However, the Castle's Magician tells Milon that Queen Eliza has hidden many tools, instruments and money to help him. The Magician also gives Milon a magic "Bubble" to assist him in finding the places where the helpful items are hidden and where they may be bought.

Gameplay

The player controls Milon by running, jumping and shooting bubbles. The player starts out at the bottom floor of a four-story castle, named Castle Garland, and he must work his way upward, searching the three main stories, the well, two side towers and the very top. If the player stays too long outside of the castle, lightning bolts fall off from the sky. Each room of the castle contains many enemies and hidden items. Milon's bubbles are both a weapon as well as a tool; throwing bubbles at soft blocks causes them to break apart and either create additional routes, reveal hidden shops, or expose specific items. The bubbles can also destroy the demons that inhabit the given rooms, although they will come back to life after several seconds. Each story can only be reached by defeating the first boss. Although seemingly basic, the only way the bosses can even be reached is by discovering a host of secrets, some of which require sheer luck or a helpful manual. This is because there is no visual difference between these "soft blocks" hiding the secrets and the "hard blocks" which are just walls. When a demon-monster dies, it stays dead and releases a crystal ball and, at times, make Milon's bubbles larger and make them fly out farther. The demon-monster's room can then be used to get to the next story of the castle. Throughout the entire game the player is only given one life. When one life is lost, the game is over and the player must start over. If the player holds left on the control pad while pressing the Start button at the title screen, they can start where they left off. This command does not work before collecting the first crystal ball.

Along the way, Milon will come across various items found in shops; some shops are in plain sight, some are hidden in the differing rooms or outside the castle, and some can be found after Milon defeats a certain demon-monster boss. All of the items augment Milon in one specific way or another, although not all of them are found in shops.

The game has generally been considered by several gamers to be extremely difficult and frustrating. There are no save points, and once a player runs out of life, the game is over, but it is possible to continue after obtaining the first crystal. Unlike in most platform games of the era, Milon does not "blink" to become briefly invincible when he is attacked by an enemy, which means his energy can be sapped very quickly if he does not move away. This is offset by the fact that each room in the castle has a "honeycomb" which restores the player's life bar entirely and extends it by one unit.

The game has a rather unorthodox approach when compared to other 2D platformers; the rooms can be accessed in any order, and the rooms themselves do not flow like traditional platformer stages. In each room, there is only one single exit, which is in a fixed spot within the room. Navigating a castle's room does not always require simply running from left to right, which gives each room a free-flowing feel. Each room of the castle contains secrets similar to those of the Super Mario Bros. series; the secrets are uncovered by shooting bubbles into invisible trigger objects and breaking soft blocks.

Maze Song 

A cumulative side-quest involves finding music boxes. By touching a music box, Milon is transported to a mini-game where he attempts to pick up as many musical notes as possible, with extra points given for sharps and negative points given for accidentally picking up flats. The first time the player reaches the mini-game, only one elf with a drum appears to play the music. Each time the player collects a music box and is transported to the mini-game, a new elf with a new instrument appears, and the song gets more elaborate.

Release 
It was released for the Famicom (Japan) on November 13, 1986 and later for the Nintendo Entertainment System (North America) in September 1988.

While the Game Boy port kept the same title as the NES version's in the US, the game was released in Japan on March 26, 1993 under the name  and later in North America. The Game Boy port includes a password feature, but is otherwise mostly the same as  the NES version. Besides that, there are other differences between the Game Boy and NES versions. First, the room sizes are smaller, likely due in part to the smaller available screen size. As a result, many hidden items and platforms are not in the same absolute position, but can be found in roughly the same relative position. Second, every item costs a little less money than in the NES version. Third, the boss fights are substantially easier. Bosses send only one projectile out at a time, and the projectiles are much smaller. Finally, the ending has new illustrations added to it.

The NES version was re-released in 2005 as part of a compilation on the Game Boy Advance known as Hudson Best Collection Vol. 3. The same version of the game was also released to mobile phones, the Japan-exclusive Hudson Channel for the PS2 and the Wii's Virtual Console service in Japan and North America in 2007 and in the PAL region as an import release in 2010. It was also released on October 31, 2013 on the Nintendo 3DS's Virtual Console service.

Reception

Upon release in 1986, Famicom Tsūshin (Famitsu) magazine gave the original Famicom version a score of 29 out of 40. The Wii Virtual Console version released in 2007 later received a negative reception. GameSpot's Frank Provo described the game as "easily one of the worst games ever made". Provo criticized the control scheme, saying Milon "runs like his feet are greased, and his jumps are easily interrupted by nearby blocks that are adjacent or directly above him". Provo awarded Milon's Secret Castle a "terrible" score of 2.0/10. Power Unlimited gave the Game Boy version a score of 83% commenting: "Milon's Secret Castle isn't very original, but fortunately it contains a few fun puzzles, while the action remains good. It also looks very good for the Game Boy."

Legacy
In 1996, a Super Famicom sequel to the game was released only in Japan, known as DoReMi Fantasy: Milon no Dokidoki Daibouken.

There are some references to Milon's Secret Castle in a few Hudson Soft games. Milon made a cameo appearance in the Sega Saturn game Saturn Bomberman, and in Star Soldier there are hidden Milon tiles that can only be uncovered and destroyed for a 40,000-point bonus when certain score conditions are met.

In 2006, a Nintendo DS puzzle game was released only in Japan under the title Milon no Hoshizora Shabon: Puzzle Kumikyoku.

Milon's Secret Castle was one of the videogames based for Manga titled Famicom Rocky from 1985 to 1987 and Nekketsu! Famicom Shounendan from 1986 to 1987 published by Coro Coro Comics.

References

External links

Milon's Secret Castle at GameFAQs

1986 video games
Game Boy games
Hudson Soft games
Konami franchises
Nintendo Entertainment System games
PlayStation 2 games
Single-player video games
Video games developed in Japan
Video games scored by Takeaki Kunimoto
Video games set in castles
Virtual Console games for Nintendo 3DS
Virtual Console games for Wii